Ovens is a town in north east Victoria, Australia located at the junction of the Ovens River and Happy Valley Creek. The area is part of the Alpine Valleys Wine region, and was formerly used for tobacco plantations. Ovens acts as a bypass to many of the local snow fields.

The first Post Office in the area opened on 9 March 1891 as Barwidgee Railway Station, renamed Ovens Vale Railway Station shortly after, Ovens Vale in 1899 and, finally Ovens in 1928.

References

 
 

Towns in Victoria (Australia)
Alpine Shire